, shortened to , is a Japanese light novel series written by Pan Tachibana and illustrated by Yoshiaki Katsurai. The story centers on Ryosuke Kaga, a lecherous high school student who makes a contract with Lisara Restall, a beautiful Grim Reaper, in exchange for his lecherous spirit.

Dakara Boku wa, H ga Dekinai began serialization in Fujimi Shobo's Dragon Magazine in 2010. The series' eleven volumes were released between June 19, 2010, and August 20, 2013. A manga adaptation illustrated by Shou Okagiri began serialization in the May 2011 issue of Monthly Dragon Age, and released five volumes as of December 9, 2013. A 12-episode anime adaptation produced by Feel was announced, and aired from July to September 2012 on AT-X and other networks. The anime series was licensed by Sentai Filmworks in 2013 for distribution in North America. Sentai Filmworks has released the series on DVD, Blu-ray Disc and for online streaming.

Plot
One day, Ryosuke Kaga, a high school boy attending , meets a girl standing alone in the rain. Introducing herself as Lisara Restall, an elite Grim Reaper, she visited the human world in order to find "The Singular Man". Ryosuke makes a contract with Lisara, while sucking energy required for her activity in the human world from Ryosuke. The source of the energy is his lecherous spirit. To preserve his life, Ryosuke has no choice but to help in Lisara's search.

Characters

Main characters

Ryosuke is a second-year student at Momozomo Academy, who uses his lecherous life-energy to give Lisara energy. Also, he learns from Lisara that he will die in three months and in return for his help now, she will try to change his fate. Lisara uses the Broken Sword, Gram, which used to belong to the god of war, to form a contract with Ryosuke. However, it was revealed later that Ryosuke has the other half of Gram (which was thought to be lost), thus gaining full power of the sword. He falls in love with Lisara, and can only fully charge his lecherous spirit energy if he thinks of her body alone or with his "Invisible Dictionary". He lives on his own (until Lisara moved in) because his mother works overseas; his father died when he was 3 (his mother later reveals that his father isn't actually dead but that he disappeared). At the end of the anime, he and Lisara became a couple even though Lisara still feels uneasy about his lecherousness.

The heroine of the story, a beautiful Grim Reaper who makes a deal with Ryosuke and uses his lecherous "spirit" for energy. She wields a scythe called , which channels the element of fire. She used the hilt of the Broken Sword Gram (belonging to the Restall family) to form a contract with Ryosuke. She falls in love with Ryosuke but does not show it, unlike the other girls. Her bust size is seventy-something cm. At the end of the anime, she and Ryosuke became a couple.

Ryosuke's childhood best friend and currently Quele's partner. She developed a large bust early in her childhood and is now a 92 cm - G-cup. She has very strong feelings for Ryosuke as he protected her when they were children. She is aware of Ryosuke's lecherousness and it doesn't seem to bother her. Mina is untroubled when Lisara's true identity is revealed and lets Lisara continue her "business" with Ryosuke. She makes a contract with Quele so that she can help Ryosuke and her energy charge for Quele develops when she talks about him.

Lisara's distant cousin and another Grim Reaper. She calls Lisara "Onee-sama" despite not being her sister. She makes a contract with Mina as her energy source, to both Ryosuke's and Lisara's dismay. In battle she wields a gladius called , which channels the element of ice. She falls in love with Ryosuke but later in the series, she pushes those feelings aside to support first Mina, then Lisara.

Lisara's rival Grim Reaper during her school years at Grimwald, who is also a famous pop idol in the human world. Despite being 2nd in the school (Lisara being ranked top of her class), she has the biggest bust size of the main cast (92.5 cm - G-cup). However, her large breasts are revealed to be a result of infusing breast pads with magic, and her actual bust size is smaller than Lisara's. She wields a falchion named , which channels the element of lightning. She also claims to be in love with Ryosuke, but so far it only seems she likes him because of the energy he can create. She is also trying to find a Singular Person for herself (to level in rank) and for her employers. Instead of gaining energy from a contract with a person, she gains energy from the devotion of her fans.

Momozomo Academy students and staff

Ryosuke's classmate.

The son of the headmaster. A narcissist.

Ryosuke's classmate who has heterochromic eyes (Her left eye is blue and her right eye is red). She has the ability to determine any girl's breast size accurately from just a glance.

A bespectacled teacher at Momozomo Academy.

Restall Family

Head of the Restall family and mother of Lisara.

 
 
Maids of the Restall family.

Merilot Life Insurance
 / ?

Main antagonist of the story. He seeks to destroy the border between Grimwald and Humans' world to directly control the population over there as he believes with lengthened lifespan, caused by other grim reapers, humans are just going to destroy themselves even more. He wields the Demon Sword .

Other characters

Ryosuke's mother. Her personality is somewhat like her son's, but at a lower extent. When her husband Ryosuke disappeared, she took care of her son on her own. She is unaware that her husband is from Grimwald and a member of the Galdarblog family.

Ryosuke's pet dog, a German Shepherd. He served briefly as Iria's temporary provisional contractor, to her own embrassment.

Media

Light novels
Dakara Boku wa, H ga Dekinai began as a light novel series written by Pan Tachibana with illustrations by Yoshiaki Katsurai. The first light novel volume was released by Fujimi Shobo on June 19, 2010, under their Fujimi Fantasia Bunko imprint. The series finished with the eleventh volume, published on August 20, 2013.

Manga
A manga adaptation illustrated by Shou Okagiri began serialization in the March 2011 issue of Monthly Dragon Age, published on February 9, 2011. The first bound volume was released October 8, 2011, with a total of five volumes available as of December 9, 2013. A limited edition of the fourth volume was released on March 27, 2013, and was bundled with a Blu-ray containing an anime episode. Yen Press licensed the manga for release in North America, with the first volume to release on April 21, 2015.

Anime
An anime adaptation, first announced on December 28, 2011, aired on AT-X and other networks from July 6, 2012, to September 25, 2012. The anime is produced by Feel under the directorship of Takeo Takahashi, with series composition by Naruhisa Arakawa, music by Cher Watanabe, and characters by Kanetoshi Kamimoto. The anime is licensed in North America by Sentai Filmworks under the title So, I Can't Play H?, with simulcasts provided by Crunchyroll during the anime's airing and Section23 Films releasing the series in 2013. The series was released in Japan as six DVD and Blu-ray volumes between September 26, 2012, and February 20, 2013, and in North America on DVD and Blu-ray sets on December 31, 2013. An OVA episode was released on Blu-ray, bundled with the fourth manga volume on March 27, 2013. Episodes 8 and later were delayed by one week due to production issues.

The songs were released as CD singles on July 25, 2012, and August 8, 2012, under the Lantis label.

Episode list

Reception
The streaming series was given favorable reviews by Theron Martin of the Anime News Network. Episodes 1–6 received grades from B− for the sub to B+ for the art. Episodes 7–12 received grades from B− for the music to B for everything else. The North American Blu-ray release was reviewed by Chris Beveridge for The Fandom Post. He gave it a favorable review, with an overall grade of "B".

References

External links
 Dakara Boku wa, H ga Dekinai at Fujimi Shobo 
 Official anime website 
 Anime Network, Watch: So, I Can’t Play H
 

2010 Japanese novels
2011 manga
2012 anime television series debuts
Anime and manga based on light novels
Fantasy anime and manga
Feel (animation studio)
Fujimi Fantasia Bunko
Fujimi Shobo manga
Kadokawa Dwango franchises
Light novels
Manga series
NBCUniversal Entertainment Japan
Sentai Filmworks
Sex comedy anime and manga
Shinigami in anime and manga
Shōnen manga
Television shows based on light novels
Yen Press titles